Bohdan Borovskyi (born 17 September 1992) is a Ukrainian football midfielder playing with FC Continentals in the Canadian Soccer League.

Career

Ukraine 
He was a product of FC Ametyst Oleksandria sportive school. After graduating from the academy level he played in the Ukrainian First League in 2010 with FC Oleksandriya. In his debut season, he assisted the club in securing promotion to the Ukrainian Premier League by winning the league title. In 2012, he played in the Ukrainian Second League with Zhemchuzhina Yalta. The following season he remained in the third tier with UkrAhroKom Holovkivka but only for a season as he helped secure promotion to the First League.

In 2014, he signed with league rivals FC Hirnyk Kryvyi Rih.where he played for two seasons. He returned to his former club Oleksandriya in 2016 and had a loan spell with FC Inhulets Petrove. After failing to break into the first team he signed with MFC Kremin Kremenchuk in 2017. He remained in the second tier by signing with FC Hirnyk-Sport Horishni Plavni in 2018 where he played for two seasons. In 2019, he was released from his contract with Hirnyk.

Canada 
In 2019, he played abroad in the Canadian Soccer League with FC Vorkuta. In his debut season with Vorkuta, he assisted the club in securing the First Division title. The following season he featured in the CSL Championship final against Scarborough SC and assisted in securing the championship by recording a goal.

In 2021, he assisted in securing Vorkuta's third regular-season title and secured the ProSound Cup against Scarborough. He also played in the 2021 playoffs where Vorkuta was defeated by Scarborough in the championship final. In 2022, Vorkuta was renamed FC Continentals and he re-signed with the club for the season. Throughout the 2022 season, he helped the Continentals to secure a playoff berth by finishing fourth in the standings. In the second round of the playoffs, he contributed a goal against the Serbian White Eagles which advanced the team to the championship final. He made his third consecutive championship final appearance against Scarborough once more where he won his second championship title.

Personal life  
His father Stanislav was also a footballer.

Honors 
FC Vorkuta

 CSL Championship: 2020, 2022
 Canadian Soccer League First Division/Regular Season: 2019, 2021 
ProSound Cup: 2021

References

External links 
 
 

Ukrainian footballers
Association football midfielders
1992 births
Living people
People from Oleksandriia
FC Oleksandriya players
FC Hirnyk Kryvyi Rih players
FC UkrAhroKom Holovkivka players
FC Inhulets Petrove players
FC Kremin Kremenchuk players
FC Hirnyk-Sport Horishni Plavni players
FC Continentals players
Ukrainian First League players
Canadian Soccer League (1998–present) players
Ukrainian Second League players
Sportspeople from Kirovohrad Oblast